Urban Search and Rescue Nevada Task Force 1 or NV-TF1 is a FEMA Urban Search and Rescue Task Force based in Clark County, Nevada. The task force  is sponsored by the Clark County Fire Department but also has members from the Las Vegas Fire & Rescue, Henderson Fire Department, North Las Vegas Fire Department and the Las Vegas Metropolitan Police Department.

Deployments 
Since its creation, NV-TF1 has been deployed to multiple disasters across the nation. 
 2001 - World Trade Center
 2005 - Hurricane Katrina
 2005 - Hurricane Rita
 2017 - Hurricane Harvey
 2017 - Hurricane Irma

References

External links 

Nevada 1
Clark County, Nevada